Leslie or Lesley Rogers may refer to:

Leslie Rogers (curler) in 2006–07 curling season 
Les Rogers (footballer)
Lesley Rogers, figure skater in 1997 World Figure Skating Championships

See also
Les Rogers (disambiguation)